Akbank Sanat is an art center founded by the Turkish bank Akbank in 1993. The art center is located in Beyoğlu, İstanbul and organizes over 700 events every year.

The Center and Its Events 
Akbank Sanat is located in Beyoğlu and consists of 6 floors. The entrance and the first floor host have hosted 150 contemporary art exhibitions to date. The second floor has a conference hall which can host 125 people. The Akbank Short Film Competition, concerts, plays and lectures are regularly hosted in the hall.  On the third floor, there is an art workshop for plastic artists. A library and a cafeteria are located on the fourth floor, and the sixth floor is utilised for dance lessons.

Akbank Short Film Festival 
Akbank Short Film Festival, is a short film festival organised by Akbank since 2005. The movies which gain a prize from the competition are demonstrated in various cities and universities around Turkey.

Akbank Jazz Festival 
Akbank Jazz Festival first took place in 1991 as a series of concerts in Istanbul.  The festival is a member of European Jazz Network.

The festival has taken place in locations such as Haghia Irini Museum, Babylon, Cemal Reşit Rey Konser Salonu and Zorlu Center PSM.

The festival has hosted musicians such as:
Cecil Taylor
Archie Shepp
Roberto Fonseca
Terje Rypdal
Miroslav Vitous
Abdullah Ibrahim
Aydın Esen
Dave Holland
John Zorn
Cassandra Wilson
Joachim Kühn
Joe Zawinul
Anthony Braxton
McCoy Tyner
Joe Lovano
Courtney Pine
Pharoah Sanders
Muhal Richard Abrams
Roscoe Mitchell
Arto Lindsay
Richard Bona
Max Roach
Nguyen Le
Dino Saluzzi
Jimmy Smith
Art Ensemble of Chicago

Contemporary Istanbul 
Akbank Sanat is the main sponsor of Contemporary Istanbul Art Fair, which was organized in 2016 for the 11th time.

References

External links
 

Arts centres in Turkey
Buildings and structures in Istanbul
Tourist attractions in Istanbul